The 2020–21 Duke Blue Devils men's basketball team represented Duke University during the 2020–21 NCAA Division I men's basketball season. They were coached by 41st-year head coach, Mike Krzyzewski. The Blue Devils played their home games at Cameron Indoor Stadium in Durham, North Carolina, as a member of the Atlantic Coast Conference.

Known for consistent high-level performance under Krzyzewski's tenure, the Blue Devils struggled to match their norm this season. Duke fell out of the AP and Coaches Poll rankings within the first few weeks and struggled to maintain a winning record. The Blue Devils finished the 2020–21 season 13–11, and 9–9 to finish in tenth place in ACC play.  Duke spent much of the late season on the bubble, according to bracketologists, and ultimately their season ended when a positive COVID-19 test forced them to drop out of the ACC tournament ahead of the quarterfinals. Duke missed the NCAA tournament for the first time since 1995.

Previous season
The Blue Devils finished the 2019–20 season 25–6, and 15–5 to finish in a tie for second place in ACC play. The team was scheduled to play NC State in the  quarterfinals of the ACC tournament before the tournament was canceled due to the ongoing COVID-19 pandemic. The 2020 NCAA tournament was also canceled due to the pandemic.

Offseason

Departures

2020 recruiting class
The 2020 recruiting class was ranked third in the nation by 247 Sports' Composite Ranking.

2021 recruiting class

Roster

Depth chart

Schedule and results
Due to the ongoing coronavirus pandemic, the start of the season was pushed back from the scheduled start of November 10. On September 16, 2020, the NCAA announced that November 25 would be the new start date. Matchups for ACC–Big Ten Challenge were released on October 30. The Champions Classic, which was originally to be held on November 10, was later moved to December 1 and was to be held in Orlando. However, due to disagreements between ESPN, who was staging the event (and others), over health and safety protocols related to COVID-19, the event was canceled. It was hoped that the event could be still held elsewhere. It was later reported that the Blue Devils would play their Champions Classic game at Duke while Kentucky and Kansas will play in Indianapolis due to conflicting COVID-19 protocols by the respective schools.

Prior to the start of the season, it was announced that Duke would not play its scheduled season opener against Gardner–Webb, which had a positive coronavirus test within its team. On December 10, 2020, the school announced that it would cancel the remaining non-conference games, meaning games already postponed would not be made up.

|-
!colspan=9 style=| Regular season

|-
!colspan=12 style=| ACC Tournament

Source

Rankings

On January 18, 2021, Duke fell out of the AP Top 25 ranking for the first time since February 8, 2016. This marked the first time since December 25, 1961 that Duke, Kentucky and North Carolina were all out of the Top 25 ranking.

^Coaches did not release a Week 1 poll.

References

2020–21 Atlantic Coast Conference men's basketball season
2020–21
2020 in sports in North Carolina
2021 in sports in North Carolina